Osama Saadi (born 1 January 1963) is an Israeli Arab lawyer and politician. He was a member of the Knesset for the Joint List.

Biography
Saadi studied law at the Hebrew University of Jerusalem, where he was chair of the Arab Student Union. He worked as a lawyer, dealing with security prisoners and members of the Palestinian Legislative Council who were expelled from East Jerusalem.

He became secretary general of the Ta'al party after it was established in 1996 by his brother-in-law, Ahmad Tibi. He was second on the party's list for the 1996 Knesset elections, but it failed to win a seat. In the 2003 elections, he was in seventh place on the joint Hadash–Ta'al list, but it won only three seats.

Prior to the 2015 elections, he was placed 12th on the Joint List, an alliance of Hadash, Balad, Ta'al and the United Arab List. He was elected to the Knesset as the Joint List won 13 seats. He resigned from the Knesset on 20 September 2017, and was replaced by Ibrahim Hijazi, as part of a rotation agreement between the parties within the Joint List. Ta'al ran in an alliance with Hadash for the April 2019 Knesset elections, with Sa'adi in fourth place. He was returned to the Knesset as the alliance won six seats.

Saadi is married, with five children, and lives in Jerusalem.

References

External links

1963 births
Living people
20th-century Israeli lawyers
21st-century Israeli lawyers
Arab members of the Knesset
Hebrew University of Jerusalem Faculty of Law alumni
Israeli Muslims
Israeli people of Saudi Arabian descent
Members of the 20th Knesset (2015–2019)
Members of the 21st Knesset (2019)
Members of the 22nd Knesset (2019–2020)
Members of the 23rd Knesset (2020–2021)
Members of the 24th Knesset (2021–2022)
People from Arraba, Israel
Ta'al politicians